Les Braves de Valleyfield are a Junior ice hockey team from Salaberry-de-Valleyfield, Quebec, Canada.  They were a part of the Quebec Junior AAA Hockey League for 25 seasons. Another franchise relocated and took over their market and former moniker in 2014.

History

The Valleyfield Braves is the second team to bear this name. The first Braves team was formed in 1944 as a Senior Amateur hockey team in the Quebec Provincial Hockey League, then moved to the Quebec Senior Hockey League in 1945 and finally as a Minor League team with the Quebec Hockey League from 1953 to 1955.

The current Valleyfield team won their first league championship in 1999. The Braves advanced to the Fred Page Cup in Charlottetown, Prince Edward Island. The tournament was won by the Charlottetown Abbies. In 2002, the Braves returned to the Fred Page Cup in Truro, Nova Scotia. The Valleyfield Braves playing a semi-final games against the CJHL's Ottawa Jr. Senators in a must-win game between both teams. The Halifax Oland Exports got a bye to the final and were hosting the Royal Bank Cup and the Central representative was to be decided between Valleyfield and Ottawa. Ottawa won 7-2 and advanced to the Royal Bank Cup, while Valleyfield returned home. The town of Salaberry-de-Valleyfield and the Valleyfield Braves were chosen to host the Fred Page Cup in 2004. The Valleyfield Braves out-powered 5th ranked St-Eustance Gladiateurs 4 games 1 in the finals. The tournament was eventually won by the CJHL's Nepean Raiders.

In 1999-00, the Valleyfield Braves played the CJHL's Brockville Braves in an inter-locking home and home series.

The Braves dissolved their QJAAAHL franchise in the Summer of 2013 to seek a membership with the semi-professional Ligue Nord-Américaine de Hockey.  The LNAH team was also known as the Valleyfield Braves. Eleven games into the 2013-14 LNAH season, the franchise relocated to Laval and became the Laval Braves.

Season-by-season record
Note: GP = Games Played, W = Wins, L = Losses, T = Ties, OTL = Overtime Losses, GF = Goals for, GA = Goals against

References

External links
Braves Webpage

Ligue de Hockey Junior AAA Quebec teams
Salaberry-de-Valleyfield
Ice hockey clubs established in 1988
Ice hockey clubs disestablished in 2013
1988 establishments in Quebec
2013 disestablishments in Quebec